Themba James Maseko (born 27 January 1961) is the former CEO of the Government Communication and Information System and spokesperson for the government of South Africa. He was appointed to the position on 14 June 2006 by then-Minister in the Presidency Essop Pahad, succeeding Joel Netshitenzhe.

Political career
Maseko had initially served as an MP in the National Assembly from 1994 to 1995, and then served as superintendent general of the Gauteng Department of Education from 1995 to 2000. He then worked as MD of the Damelin Education Group and CEO of Sifikile Investments during 2001 and 2002, followed by a term as director general of the Department of Public Works from February 2003 until his appointment as GCIS CEO.

Board memberships
Outside of government, Maseko has served on the boards of the Adopt a School Foundation, Centre for Public Service Innovation and Vista University Council.

Degrees
 BA in sociology and law and an LLB from the University of the Witwatersrand.
 MBA from De Montfort University in the United Kingdom.

References

External links
Themba Maseko article in The Guardian

Living people
South African politicians
1961 births